Eupithecia junctifascia is a moth in the  family Geometridae. It is found in Colombia and Costa Rica.

References

Moths described in 1907
junctifascia
Moths of Central America
Moths of South America